Grafomap is a Latvia-based design company that combines OpenStreetMap data with design filters, allowing people to create map posters of places in the world.

History
The company and team is located in Latvia while the posters and maps are printed and shipped from Los Angeles as well as Riga. Grafomap was founded in 2016 by Rihards Piks and Karlis Bikis.

According to co-founder Rihards Piks, the start-up is inspired by Snazzy Maps. It is a Word Press plugin that colored the maps for contact pages of websites. The idea transformed into creating maps in real for people who would like to use the maps as wall posters and highlight areas of personal importance to them. This focus on memories of individuals to be used as an interior art form became the driving force of the company's business model.

The start-up has been featured in numerous mainstream fashion, art and business outlets like The Guardian, Chicago Tribune, Launching Next, The Coolector, Simply Grove, PSFK and Product Hunt for their maps focusing on regions of sentimental value and the mapping as a decor per se.

References

External links
 

Companies of Latvia
Design companies
Design companies established in 2016
Latvian companies established in 2016